Dan Martin Nataniel Dahlin (born 16 April 1968) is a Swedish former professional footballer who played as a striker. In his prime, he was considered one of the world's best strikers.

Starting off his career with Malmö FF in 1987, he was the 1988 Allsvenskan top scorer and played for clubs in the Bundesliga, Serie A, and the Premier League before retiring in 1999.

A full international between 1991 and 1997, he won 60 caps for the Sweden national team and was a part of the Sweden team that finished third in the 1994 FIFA World Cup. He also represented Sweden at the 1988 Summer Olympics as well as UEFA Euro 1992. In 1993, he was awarded Guldbollen as Sweden's best footballer of the year.

Early life
Dahlin was born in Uddevalla, Sweden. He is the son of a Venezuelan father, who was a musician, and a Swedish mother. Named after Martin Luther King Jr., he was born in Uddevalla, but spent his upbringing in Lund.

Club career
In 1993, he was selected as best Swedish player of the year, winning Guldbollen.

He played for Malmö FF, Borussia Mönchengladbach, A.S. Roma, Hamburger SV and Blackburn Rovers. The most successful time of his career he spent with Borussia Mönchengladbach with whom he won the German Cup in 1995 along with Stefan Effenberg.

Dahlin transferred from Roma to Blackburn Rovers in mid-1997 and made 21 appearances in the 1997–98 season, scoring four goals.

In the 1998–99 season, he only played five games when an injury in a training game ruled him out for the rest of the season and contributed to his retirement from the game after a short spell at Hamburger SV in 1999.

Blackburn Rovers later sued their insurance company who had refused to pay out over the injury claiming that normal wear and tear could have been a contributing factor. Although the initial verdict was given in favour of the club, in 2005 the Court of Appeal overturned the verdict and sent it back to the lower court. On 12 April 2006, the High Court ruled in favour of the insurance company, decreeing that the player probably had a pre-existing condition. This decision left Blackburn about £4 million out-of-pocket.

International career
In 1988, he became the second afro Swedish player to represent Sweden. He was part of the Swedish national team which finished third in the 1994 FIFA World Cup, scoring four goals in the tournament. He also participated in the team which reached the semifinals of UEFA Euro 1992.

Retirement
Dahlin officially lives in Monaco. He lends his name to a clothing line. He speaks three languages – Swedish, English and German.

Dahlin became a sports agent working for former teammate Roger Ljung's sport agency Roger Ljung Promotion AB. He has since formed his own agency called MD Management. He represents Ola Toivonen, Guillermo Molins, Markus Rosenberg, Jonas Olsson,  Behrang Safari and Pontus Jansson.

Career statistics

Club
Source:

International
Appearances and goals by national team and year

International goals
Scores and results list Sweden's goal tally first.

Honours
Malmö FF

 Swedish Champion: 1988

 Allsvenskan: 1988, 1989
 Svenska Cupen: 1988–89

Borussia Mönchengladbach
 DFB-Pokal: 1994–95

Sweden
 FIFA World Cup third place: 1994

Individual
 Allsvenskan top scorer: 1988
 Guldbollen: 1993
 kicker Bundesliga Team of the Season: 1995–96

References

External links

Living people
1968 births
Association football forwards
Swedish footballers
Footballers from Skåne County
People from Uddevalla Municipality
Sweden international footballers
Sweden under-21 international footballers
Sweden youth international footballers
Swedish expatriate footballers
lunds BK players
Malmö FF players
Borussia Mönchengladbach players
A.S. Roma players
Hamburger SV players
Blackburn Rovers F.C. players
Allsvenskan players
Bundesliga players
Serie A players
Premier League players
Expatriate footballers in England
Expatriate footballers in Germany
Expatriate footballers in Italy
Association football agents
Swedish sports agents
UEFA Euro 1992 players
1994 FIFA World Cup players
Olympic footballers of Sweden
Footballers at the 1988 Summer Olympics
Swedish people of Venezuelan descent
Swedish expatriate sportspeople in England
Swedish expatriate sportspeople in Germany
Swedish expatriate sportspeople in Italy